Matic Fink (born 27 February 1990) is a Slovenian footballer who plays as a defender.

Honours
Olimpija Ljubljana
Slovenian PrvaLiga: 2015–16
Slovenian Cup: 2020–21

References

External links

Player profile at NZS 

1990 births
Living people
Footballers from Ljubljana
Slovenian footballers
Slovenia youth international footballers
Slovenia under-21 international footballers
Association football fullbacks
NK IB 1975 Ljubljana players
NK Olimpija Ljubljana (2005) players
Çaykur Rizespor footballers
MKS Cracovia (football) players
Boluspor footballers
NK Domžale players
Slovenian expatriate footballers
Slovenian expatriate sportspeople in Turkey
Expatriate footballers in Turkey
Slovenian expatriate sportspeople in Poland
Expatriate footballers in Poland
Slovenian PrvaLiga players
Slovenian Second League players
Süper Lig players
Ekstraklasa players
TFF First League players